Fernwood School may refer to:

 Fernwood School, Kohima, Nagaland, India
 Fernwood School, Nottingham, Nottinghamshire, England